Anton Gaddefors (born November 4, 1989) is a Swedish professional basketball player who currently plays for Södertälje BBK.

His younger brother, Viktor Gaddefors, is also a basketball player. In December 2016,  Anton Gaddefors made a comeback in Uppsala basketball.

See also
 List of foreign basketball players in Serbia

References

External links
  Anton Gaddefors at Eurobasket
 Anton Gaddefors at abaliga.com

1989 births
Living people
ABA League players
KK Radnički Kragujevac (2009–2014) players
Lega Basket Serie A players
Liège Basket players
Okapi Aalstar players
Orlandina Basket players
Shooting guards
Small forwards
Sportspeople from Stockholm
Sundsvall Dragons players
Swedish expatriate basketball people in Belgium
Swedish expatriate basketball people in Italy
Swedish expatriate basketball people in Poland
Swedish expatriate basketball people in Serbia
Swedish men's basketball players
KKK MOSiR Krosno players
Uppsala Basket players
Södertälje Kings players